Bagh Konar (also Romanized as Bāgh Konār, Bāgh-e Kanār, Bāgh-e Kenār, Bāgh-i-Kanār, and Bagh Kenar) is a village in Dehsard Rural District, in the Central District of Arzuiyeh County, Kerman Province, Iran. In the 2006 census, its population was 40, and 10 families.

References 

Populated places in Arzuiyeh County